The men's eight competition at the 1988 Summer Olympics took place at Misari Regatta, South Korea. It was held from 20 to 25 September. There were 10 boats (90 competitors) from 10 nations, with each nation limited to a single boat in the event. The event was won by West Germany, the nation's first victory (and first medal) in the men's eight since 1968. It was West Germany's second gold medal in the event, tying Great Britain and East Germany for second-most, behind the United States with 11. In a photo finish for second place, the Soviet Union took silver over the United States.

Background

This was the 20th appearance of the event. Rowing had been on the programme in 1896 but was cancelled due to bad weather. The men's eight has been held every time that rowing has been contested, beginning in 1900.

The United States had dominated the men's eight for four decades from the 1920s through the 1950s, but had not taken Olympic gold since 1964. A victory in the 1987 World Rowing Championships set up the Americans as favourites to return to the top of the Olympic podium, particularly as the East Germans (a power in the event in the 1970s and 1980s) were not competing for the second straight Games. Other significant contenders were the 1985 World champions the Soviet Union and the 1986 World champions Australia.

No nations made their debut in the event. The United States made its 17th appearance, most among nations to that point.

Competition format

The "eight" event featured nine-person boats, with eight rowers and a coxswain. It was a sweep rowing event, with the rowers each having one oar (and thus each rowing on one side). The course used the 2000 metres distance that became the Olympic standard in 1912 (with the exception of 1948). Races were held in up to six lanes.

The competition consisted of two main rounds (heats and finals) as well as a repechage. The 10 boats were divided into two heats for the first round, with 5 boats in each heat. The winner of each heat (2 boats total) advanced directly to the "A" final. The remaining 8 boats were placed in the repechage. The repechage featured two heats of 4 boats each, with the top two boats in each heat (4 boats total) advancing to the "A" final and the remaining 4 boats (3rd and 4th placers in the repechage heats) being eliminated from medal contention and sent to the "B" final to determine 7th through 10th places.

Schedule

All times are Korea Standard Time adjusted for daylight savings (UTC+10)

Results

Semifinals

Semifinal 1

Semifinal 2

Repechage

Repechage heat 1

Repechage heat 2

Finals

Final B

Final A

Final classification

References

Rowing at the 1988 Summer Olympics
Men's events at the 1988 Summer Olympics